Sergey Lazarevich Lashkarev (23 February 1739 — 6 October 1814) (derived from ), was a Russian Imperial Major-General of Georgian origin. A cunning diplomat and polyglot, he was described by his contemporaries as one of the "remarkable phenomena of Catherine the Great's century". Lashkarev was reportedly fluent in ten languages. Besides Russian and Georgian, he spoke French, Italian, Turkish, Persian, Greek,  Armenian, Arabic, and Latin. In 1800, Lashkarev was actively involved in diplomatic exchanges with the Ottoman Empire in connection with the impending Russian annexation of various Georgian kingdoms and principalities, and remained in charge of Georgian affairs at the Imperial court under Alexander I of Russia.

Personal life
Lashkarev was the son of a Georgian nobleman Lazare Grigoris dze Lashkarashvili-Bibiluri (later known as Lashkarev-Bibilurov) who moved to Russia from Georgia as part of a royal entourage accompanying the exiled Georgian monarch Vakhtang VI.

Lashkarev had four children:

 Pavel Sergeevich Lashkarev (1776—1857) — Major-General, hero of the Napoleonic Wars
 Aleksandr Sergeevich Lashkarev (1779—1849) — General-Lieutenant, recipient of the Order of St. George
 Sergey Sergeevich Lashkarev (1783—1858) — Privy Councillor of the Russian Empire, Diplomat
 Grigory Sergeevich Lashkarev (1788—1849) — General-Lieutenant, Governor of Volhynian Governorate, as well as that of Podolia Governorate and Kiev Governorates.

See also
Georgians in Russia
Pavel Tsitsianov
Vakhtang VI

References

Russian people of Georgian descent
18th-century military personnel from the Russian Empire
Nobility of Georgia (country)
Generals from Georgia (country)
Georgian generals in the Imperial Russian Army
Georgian lieutenant generals (Imperial Russia)
1739 births
1814 deaths
Privy Councillor (Russian Empire)